The 2020 Indoor Football League season was the twelfth season of the Indoor Football League (IFL). The league was set to play the season with thirteen teams, up from ten the previous season, by adding three expansion teams, one team from Champions Indoor Football, and one team folding.

After playing two games, the season was initially postponed on March 12 due to social distancing measures closing venues during the COVID-19 pandemic. On April 13, the league cancelled the rest of the season due to the uncertainty that they would be able to play in any venues in the near future.

Offseason 
On August 20, 2019, the Duke City Gladiators joined the IFL after winning back-to-back CIF championships. On September 10, the Oakland Panthers, co-owned by NFL running back Marshawn Lynch, joined the IFL for the 2020 season. On November 1, the league added the Spokane Shock after it was resurrected by former NFL player Sam Adams, with the Spokane team reacquiring the Shock brand following the Spokane Empire's folding in 2017. The Bosselman family were looking to sell the Nebraska Danger, but no owner was found before the deadline for participating in the 2020 season. On November 24, 2019, the IFL added a thirteenth team in Frisco, Texas, owned by the Germain family called the Frisco Fighters. The Germain family also purchased the sponsorship rights for the IFL, the management rights of the league's communications and marketing department, as well as a second expansion for the 2021 season in Columbus, Ohio.

Teams

Standings
The season began on March 7, 2020, and the league played two games before postponing the season due to the COVID-19 pandemic.

y – clinched regular season title

x – clinched playoff spot

Last updated: March 18, 2020

Playoffs
The top eight teams would have made the IFL playoffs, with the quarterfinals consisting of the top seed hosting the eighth seed, the second seed hosting the seventh seed, the third seed hosting the sixth seed, and the fourth hosting the fifth seed. In the semifinals, the highest remaining seed would host the lower remaining seed and the next-highest hosts the next-lowest from the quarterfinals. The semifinal winners were to meet in the 2020 United Bowl on the weekend of July 25.

References

Indoor Football League seasons
Indoor Football League season
Indoor Football League